JMTC may refer to:

 Joint Maritime Training Center, a joint U.S. Coast Guard, Navy, and Marine Corps training center
 Joint Multinational Training Command, a U.S. Army training command